Roberto Delmastro Naso (October 17, 1945 – December 26, 2014) was a Chilean politician and engineer. He served as a member of the Chamber of Deputies of Chile for Valdivia from March 11, 1998, to March 11, 2014.

Delmastro died from lung cancer on December 26, 2014, at the age of 69.

References

1945 births
2014 deaths
Members of the Chamber of Deputies of Chile
Chilean foresters
National Renewal (Chile) politicians
Austral University of Chile alumni
People from Valdivia